The 2019–20 season was Middlesbrough's third consecutive season in the Championship in their 144th year in existence, the club also competed in the FA Cup and the EFL Cup. The season covered the period from 1 July 2019 to 20 July 2020.

George Friend continues as the official club captain in his first full season in the role, having previously replaced a departing Grant Leadbitter in the second half of the 2018–19 season, who left to return to Sunderland in January 2019.

This season also marked Jonathan Woodgate's first spell in charge of a professional club, who replaced an outgoing Tony Pulis, who left at the end of his contract. Woodgate was sacked as manager on 23 June 2020, with Middlesbrough only outside the Championship relegation zone on goal difference after 38 games. He was replaced with experienced manager Neil Warnock on the same day.

Squad

  = Player on loan

Transfers

Transfers in

Transfers out

Loans in

Loans out

Pre-season
Boro announced their pre-season programme on 14 June 2019.

Competitions

Championship

League table

Results by matchday

Result summary

Matches
On 20 June 2019, the forthcoming Championship fixtures were unveiled.

FA Cup

The third round draw was made live on BBC Two from Etihad Stadium, Micah Richards and Tony Adams conducted the draw.

EFL Cup

The first round draw was made on 20 June.

References

Middlesbrough F.C. seasons
Middlesbrough